Victor Perera was the first Governor of Northern Province and former Sri Lankan Inspector General of Police.

Police career
Perera joined the Sri Lanka Police Service in 1974 as an Assistant Superintendent of Police. Serving as the most senior Deputy Inspector General of Police he was promoted as the 30th Inspector General Police on 12 October 2006 and retired from service on 3 June 2008. He was succeeded by the senior Deputy Inspector General of Police Jayantha Wickramarathne.

Political career
With the division of the North Eastern Province in 2007 Perera was appointed, by President Mahinda Rajapakse, as the first Governor of Northern Province, succeeding acting governor Rear Admiral Mohan Wijewickrema. Perera was the first former head of the police to have been appointed as a Governor to a province.

See also
 Inspector General of Police (Sri Lanka)
 Sri Lanka Police Service

References

External links

|-

|-

Governors of Northern Province, Sri Lanka
Sri Lankan Inspectors General of Police